The Princeton Community Japanese Language School (PCJLS; プリンストン日本語学校 Purinsuton Nihongo Gakkō) is a Japanese weekend school in the Princeton, New Jersey area. It holds weekend Japanese classes for Japanese citizen children abroad to the standard of the Ministry of Education, Culture, Sports, Science and Technology (MEXT), and it also has classes for people with Japanese as a second language.

Courses are held at Bierenbaum Fisher Hall (formerly Memorial Hall) at Rider University in Lawrence Township, Mercer County. The school offices are in Princeton, except on Sundays, when the offices are at Rider University.

This is one of the Japanese weekend school systems in the New York metropolitan area.

History
Five Japanese researchers at Princeton University founded the PCJLS in 1980. It was originally at that institution but moved to Rider in 1996.

In 1987 its weekend courses for children covered Kindergarten through the 7th grade.

Curriculum
The school's Japanese Ministry of Education (MEXT)-compliant classes are part of its Division 1. The principal of Division 1 is funded by MEXT. In addition, the school offers Japanese heritage language courses, Japanese as a foreign language courses, and courses for adults as part of Division 2, which is oriented to children attending university in the United States and other persons from English-dominant households. The school's teachers developed their own kanji textbooks for use in these courses. Placement into a particular division involves consultations in which the student, the parents, and/or PCJLS teachers are involved.

In 1987 the school also had Japanese language courses for adults who work in businesses.

Student body
Many PCJLS students are U.S. permanent residents with at least some Japanese ancestral origin, including multilingual students with one or more parents who speak a language not English and/or not Japanese, and/or bilingual students living in English-dominant households. These students often attend heritage classes and/or Japanese as a second language courses.

In 1987 students came from the states of New Jersey, Pennsylvania, and Delaware. Some of the students came from Fort Lee and some came from South Jersey.

In 187 the school had around 20-25 adult students and 100 child students.

Teaching staff
Parents, as of 2012, make up 70% of the teachers at PCJLS.

See also
 Japanese Weekend School of New York - Another Japanese weekend school system in the New York City area

References
 Kano, Naomi (加納 なおみ Kanō Naomi). "Japanese Community Schools: New Pedagogy for a Changing Population" (Chapter 6). In: García, Ofelia, Zeena Zakharia, and Bahar Otcu (editors). Bilingual Community Education and Multilingualism: Beyond Heritage Languages in a Global City (Volume 89 of Bilingual Education and Bilingualism). Multilingual Matters, 2012. , 9781847698001. START: p. 99.

References

External links

Princeton Community Japanese Language School (Archive)
"海外の週末日本語学校（プリンストン日本語学校の取り組み）" (Archive). Mother Tongue, Heritage Language, and Bilingual Education (MHB) Research Association (母語・継承語・バイリンガル教育（MHB）研究会).

Japanese-American culture in New Jersey
Schools in Princeton, New Jersey
Schools in Mercer County, New Jersey
Lawrence Township, Mercer County, New Jersey
Princeton